The Global Safety Information Exchange (GSIE) is a system launched by ICAO in September 2010 to confidentially share information about aviation safety incidents; enabling ICAO to identify trends may make it possible to improve safety through risk reduction.

International agreements
In September 2009, IATA, the European Commission, and the US Department of Transportation signed an agreement for information exchange which is a foundation for the GSIE.

External links
ICAO Flight Safety Information Exchange
IATA 
ICAO

References

2010 in aviation
Civil aviation authorities
Aviation safety
Aviation risks